Maria Iliou is a Greek film director, scriptwriter and producer, well known in Greece and internationally both for her feature films and the historical documentaries she has directed in recent years.  She was born in Greece and lives and works in Athens and New York City.  Her most well-known films are the features, The Four Seasons (1996), Alexandria, a Love Story (2002) and the historical documentaries The Journey: The Greek American Dream (2007), Smyrna, The Destruction of a Cosmopolitan City, 1900–1922 (2012), From Both Sides of the Aegean (2012) and Dear Aunt Lena (2017).  Her films have been shown in various countries and have won major distinctions and awards.

Early years
Maria Iliou was born in Athens in 1960, the daughter of Maria-Leda Krontira, an educator and writer of children’s books, and tobacco merchant Andreas Iliou.  On her mother's side she is descended from the island of Cephalonia and Athens and on her father's from Smyrna in Asia Minor. From a very young age she took part in the radio programs of her grandmother, Antigone Metaxa (Aunt Lena) on Hellenic Public Radio (EIR) telling stories and singing songs as well as in the radio plays of her grandfather, Kostas Krontiras’ Wednesday at the Theater, producing sounds in collaboration with the sound engineer.

She studied literature and philosophy at the University of Padua in Italy, from where she graduated summa cum laude and with an honorary distinction in 1983, supporting a doctoral thesis on indirect free speech in the works of Alexandros Papadiamantis.

She continued her studies in film directing in Italy at Ermanno Olmi’s Ipotesi Cinema film school with a scholarship from the Italian government, while participating in European Community seminars on scriptwriting, film directing and film production: EAVE (1993), Frank Daniel’s Workshop (1994), Sources (1995), Arista (1999).

Career
Maria Iliou’s career began in Greece.  From 1983 to 1985 she worked for the Hellenic Broadcasting Corporation in Athens where she directed the program A City-Ship, which presented topics related to modern literature, music and film.  During that same time she also worked as a translator presenting, for the first time in Greece, Alberto Savinio’s book Maupassant and "the other", Ypsilon Publications.

In Italy from 1987 to 1990 she worked as assistant director and Casting Director with Giuseppe and Bernardo Bertolucci on the films I Cammelli, Amori in Corso, La Domenica Specialmente, Bologna 90.

In 2003 a Fulbright career grant took her to New York where she worked on her scripts with Marketa Kimbrell at NYU’s Tisch School of the Arts and with Laurie Hutzler.
She is a member of the European Film Academy and the Hellenic Film Academy and has served as a member of the jury at international film festivals and on committees of international organizations.

Feature films
In 1987, her first film The Encounter won a Hellenic Ministry of Culture Award.  In 1991, she founded the A CITY-SHIP (MIA POLI-PLIO) production company.  Her second feature film Seaward Window (1992) won an Istituto Luce Award in Italy in 1993.  In 1996 her film Three Seasons won awards at the 37th Thessaloniki Film Festival and at the Würzburg International Film Festival in (Germany).

Her feature Alexandria, a Love Story (2001) tells the story of a mother and daughter who, on a trip to Egypt, rediscover each other through a tale about an old Alexandrian love story of the mother's.  Alexandria, a Love Story won a Hellenic Ministry of Culture award as well as awards at the international film festivals of São Paulo in Brazil, Gran Canaria in Spain and Houston in the USA, while film historian Professor Karalis called it one of the best Greek films of the 2000 decade in the history of Greek cinema.

Historical documentaries
In 2003 in New York while researching archives within the framework of the script development for her feature film A Friendship in Smyrna, during the period of her Fulbright scholarship, she discovered forgotten visual material on Smyrna as well as on the migration of the Greeks to America.  The material was so fascinating that it led her, instead of a feature film, to make a documentary while at the same time salvaging the forgotten visual material.
In 2005 she founded the non-profit company PROTEUS NY INC & PROTEAS whose purpose it is to discover and preserve audiovisual archival material related to Greek history, chiefly in America and Europe. In collaboration with other cultural organizations it produces films, exhibitions and books that make these lost images accessible to the public.

From 2007 to the present day the company has presented historical documentaries that met with great success.  The Journey: The Greek American Dream, a documentary on the immigration of the Greeks to America, was presented at the Benaki Museum in Greece and was later screened at the Metropolitan Museum of Art and on PBS in Chicago. It also won an award from the American Film Institute in Washington as one of the best films of the year. (The European Showcase). The following year she was honored for her work by the city of New York.

In 2012 she presented the historical documentary Smyrna, The Destruction of a Cosmopolitan City, 1900–1922, a documentary that brings to the people lost images of cosmopolitan Smyrna, collected from over 20 American and European archives but also a new perspective on the history of the city.  After its screening at the Benaki Museum, the documentary was screened in movie theaters in Greece and America as well as on Greek television (a total of over 250,000 viewers).  The screenings subsequently continued in European and American cities while it had a run of over three weeks at the Quad Cinema in New York. With the support of the Stavros Niarchos Foundation the documentary was also screened at 22 universities in the United States and Canada.

It was followed by the historical documentary From Both Sides of the Aegean, on the population exchange between Greece and Turkey (1922–1924). Her principal collaborator on all three of these films was the historical consultant Alexander Kitroeff (Haverford College).

In 2017 she presented the documentary Dear Aunt Lena, on the life and work of the educator Antigone Metaxa with whom many generations of Greeks grew up, tuning in to her radio programs and reading her books.  This was a very personal film since Aunt Lena was Iliou's grandmother.
Iliou is in the preparation stages for a documentary series on the history of modern Athens from 1821 to our days entitled Athens Rising.

Filmography

References

External links 
 
 Maria Iliou Interview
 https://web.archive.org/web/20181003183216/http://www.thejourneygreekamericandream.org/
 http://www.smyrnadocumentary.org
 http://www.aegeandocumentary.org

Greek screenwriters
Greek film producers
Greek documentary film directors
Greek women film directors
1960 births
Living people
Women documentary filmmakers
Film people from Athens